"Corner Pocket" is a 1955 jazz standard. Versions with lyrics are titled "Until I Met You", or "Until I Met You (Corner Pocket)".

It was composed by Freddie Green, with lyrics by Donald E. Wolf.

Recordings
The song was first popularized in 1957 by Count Basie's instrumental recording for his album April in Paris. A vocalese cover of this performance was released by The Manhattan Transfer for their 1981 album Mecca for Moderns, which would eventually earn them a Grammy Award. (The vocalese lyrics are by Jon Hendricks, although he is not credited on either Mecca for Moderns or Anthology: Down in Birdland.

Harry James recorded a version on his 1976 album The King James Version.

See also
List of jazz standards

References

1950s jazz standards
1955 songs